Aspalathus is a genus of flowering plants in the family Fabaceae. The yellow flowers and spiny habit of some species have suggested a resemblance to Ulex europaeus, the thorny "English gorse" Accordingly, "Cape Gorse" has been proposed as a common name although the resemblance is largely superficial; for instance, gorse is thorny, whereas Aspalathus species are variously spiny or unarmed. The genus belongs to the subfamily Faboideae. There are over 270 species, mainly endemic to southwestern fynbos regions in South Africa, with over fifty occurring on the Cape Peninsula alone. The species Aspalathus linearis is commercially important, being farmed as the source of Rooibos tea.

Aspalathus species generally are shrubs or sometimes shrublets. They are normally bushy, however some species can grow sprawling or upright with branches that stand on their own. The flowers of most species are plentiful in season, a rich, showy yellow very common in the Western Cape mountains in particular. The flowers of some yellow-flowering species (such as Aspalathus cordata) turn bright red as they fade. Some species, such as Aspalathus forbesii have white or cream flowers, and others, such as Aspalathus costulata and Aspalathus cordata have flowers in various shades ranging from pink to pale violet, whereas Aspalathus nigra commonly has slate-blue flowers.

Aspalathus leaves are sessile and are simple in some species, but trifoliate in others. They commonly are fascicled. In some species they bear hard, sharp, spines at their tips. There are no stipules.

Aspalathus species may be grouped into four categories for purposes of rough identification in the field. One group has undivided leaves, never tufted. this includes Rooibos, Aspalathus linearis with it needle-like leaves, and Aspalathus cordata with its stiff, neatly cordate leaves with their aggressively spiny tips, are typical examples. Another group has leaflets sharp, stiff, and acicular. Examples include Aspalathus astroites and Aspalathus chenopoda.

A third group has cylindrical, fleshy leaves, not spiny, for example Aspalathus capitata and Aspalathus pinguis, while members of the fourth group, such as Aspalathus aspalathoides and Aspalathus securifolia have more or less flat leaflets.

The fruit of Aspalathus is a pod, and in the majority of species the ovary has two ovules that yield only one seed per pod. However, some pods are several-seeded.

Various species of Aspalathus have been used in traditional medicines and as "bush teas", including Aspalathus tenuifolia, but it is difficult to know which sources to trust, because many specific names have been changed or confused in the past. Also, many uses were very local, and there was a good deal of confusion between different species, even sometimes with similar genera, such as Cyclopia, some species of which yield honeybush tea.

Species
Aspalathus comprises the following species:

 Aspalathus abietina Thunb.
 Aspalathus acanthes Eckl. & Zeyh.
 Aspalathus acanthiloba R. Dahlgren
 Aspalathus acanthoclada R. Dahlgren
 Aspalathus acanthophylla Eckl. & Zeyh.
 Aspalathus acicularis E. Mey.
 subsp. acicularis E. Mey.
 subsp. planifolia R. Dahlgren
 Aspalathus acidota R. Dahlgren
 Aspalathus acifera R. Dahlgren
 Aspalathus aciloba R. Dahlgren
 Aspalathus aciphylla Harv.
 Aspalathus aculeata Thunb.
 Aspalathus acuminata Lam.
 subsp. acuminata Lam.
 subsp. pungens (Thunb.) R. Dahlgren
 Aspalathus acutiflora R. Dahlgren

 Aspalathus albens L.
 Aspalathus alopecurus Benth.
 Aspalathus alpestris (Benth.) R. Dahlgren

 Aspalathus altissima R. Dahlgren
 Aspalathus angustifolia (Lam.) R. Dahlgren
 subsp. angustifolia (Lam.) R. Dahlgren
 subsp. robusta (E. Phillips) R. Dahlgren

 Aspalathus araneosa L.

 Aspalathus arenaria R. Dahlgren
 Aspalathus argentea L.

 Aspalathus argyrella MacOwan
 Aspalathus argyrophanes R. Dahlgren
 Aspalathus arida E. Mey.
 Aspalathus aristata Compton
 Aspalathus aristifolia R. Dahlgren

 Aspalathus aspalathoides (L.) R. Dahlgren
 Aspalathus asparagoides L. f.
 subsp. asparagoides L. f.
 subsp. rubrofusca (Eckl. & Zeyh.) R. Dahlgren
 Aspalathus astroites L.
 Aspalathus attenuata R. Dahlgren
 Aspalathus aurantiaca R. Dahlgren
 Aspalathus barbata (Lam.) R. Dahlgren
 Aspalathus barbigera R. Dahlgren
 Aspalathus batodes Eckl. & Zeyh.

 Aspalathus bidouwensis R. Dahlgren
 Aspalathus biflora E. Mey.
 Aspalathus bodkinii Bolus
 Aspalathus borbonifolia R. Dahlgren
 Aspalathus bowieana (Benth.) R. Dahlgren
 Aspalathus bracteata Thunb.

 Aspalathus burchelliana Benth.

 Aspalathus caespitosa R. Dahlgren
 Aspalathus calcarata Harv.
 Aspalathus calcarea R. Dahlgren
 Aspalathus callosa L.
 Aspalathus campestris R. Dahlgren

 Aspalathus candicans W.T. Aiton
 Aspalathus candidula R. Dahlgren

 Aspalathus capensis (Walp.) R. Dahlgren

 Aspalathus capitata L.

 Aspalathus carnosa Bergius
 Aspalathus cephalotes Thunb.
 subsp. cephalotes Thunb.
 subsp. obscuriflora R. Dahlgren
 subsp. violacea R. Dahlgren
 Aspalathus cerrantha Eckl. & Zeyh.

 Aspalathus chenopoda L.
 Aspalathus chortophila Eckl. & Zeyh.
 Aspalathus chrysantha R. Dahlgren
 Aspalathus ciliaris L.

 Aspalathus cinerascens E. Mey.
 Aspalathus citrina R. Dahlgren
 Aspalathus cliffortiifolia R. Dahlgren
 Aspalathus cliffortioides Bolus
 Aspalathus collina Eckl. & Zeyh.
 Aspalathus commutata (Vogel) R. Dahlgren

 Aspalathus compacta R. Dahlgren
 Aspalathus complicata (Benth.) R. Dahlgren
 Aspalathus comptonii R. Dahlgren
 Aspalathus concava Bolus
 Aspalathus concavifolia (Eckl. & Zeyh.) R. Dahlgren
 Aspalathus condensata R. Dahlgren

 Aspalathus confusa R. Dahlgren

 Aspalathus cordata (L.) R. Dahlgren
 Aspalathus cordicarpa (L.) R. Dahlgren
 Aspalathus corniculata R. Dahlgren

 Aspalathus corrudifolia Bergius

 Aspalathus costulata Benth.
 Aspalathus crassisepala R. Dahlgren
 Aspalathus crenata (L.) R. Dahlgren
 Aspalathus cuspidata R. Dahlgren
 Aspalathus cymbiformis DC.
 Aspalathus cytisoides Lam.
 Aspalathus dasyantha Eckl. & Zeyh.
 Aspalathus decora R. Dahlgren
 Aspalathus densifolia Benth.
 Aspalathus desertorum Bolus
 Aspalathus dianthophora E. Phillips
 Aspalathus diffusa Eckl. & Zeyh.
 Aspalathus digitifolia R. Dahlgren
 Aspalathus divaricata Thunb.
 subsp. divaricata Thunb.
 subsp. gracilior R. Dahlgren
 Aspalathus dunsdoniana R. Dahlgren

 Aspalathus elliptica (E. Phillips) R. Dahlgren

 Aspalathus ericifolia L.
 subsp. ericifolia L.
 subsp. minuta R. Dahlgren
 subsp. pusilla R. Dahlgren

 Aspalathus erythrodes Eckl. & Zeyh.
 Aspalathus esterhuyseniae R. Dahlgren
 Aspalathus excelsa R. Dahlgren

 Aspalathus fasciculata (Thunb.) R. Dahlgren
 Aspalathus ferox Harv.

 Aspalathus filicaulis Eckl. & Zeyh.
 Aspalathus flexuosa Thunb.
 Aspalathus florifera R. Dahlgren
 Aspalathus florulenta R. Dahlgren
 Aspalathus forbesii Harv.

 Aspalathus fourcadei L. Bolus
 Aspalathus frankenioides DC.
 Aspalathus fusca Thunb.
 Aspalathus galeata E. Mey.

 Aspalathus gerrardii Bolus
 Aspalathus glabrata R. Dahlgren
 Aspalathus glabrescens R. Dahlgren

 Aspalathus globosa Andrews
 Aspalathus globulosa E. Mey.
 Aspalathus glossoides R. Dahlgren

 Aspalathus grandiflora Benth.
 Aspalathus granulata R. Dahlgren
 Aspalathus grobleri R. Dahlgren
 Aspalathus heterophylla L. f.
 Aspalathus hirta E. Mey.
 subsp. hirta E. Mey.
 subsp. stellaris R. Dahlgren
 Aspalathus hispida Thunb.
 subsp. albiflora (Eckl. & Zeyh.) R. Dahlgren
 subsp. hispida Thunb.
 Aspalathus humilis Bolus
 Aspalathus hypnoides R. Dahlgren
 Aspalathus hystrix L. f.
 Aspalathus incana R. Dahlgren
 Aspalathus incompta Thunb.
 Aspalathus incurva Thunb.
 Aspalathus incurvifolia Walp.

 Aspalathus inops Eckl. & Zeyh.
 Aspalathus intermedia Eckl. & Zeyh.
 Aspalathus intervallaris Bolus
 Aspalathus intricata Compton

 Aspalathus joubertiana Eckl. & Zeyh.

 Aspalathus juniperina Thunb.

 Aspalathus karrooensis R. Dahlgren
 Aspalathus kougaensis (Garab. ex R. Dahlgren) R. Dahlgren

 Aspalathus lactea Thunb.
 subsp. breviloba R. Dahlgren
 subsp. lactea Thunb.
 Aspalathus laeta Bolus
 Aspalathus lamarckiana R. Dahlgren
 Aspalathus lanata E. Mey.
 Aspalathus lanceicarpa R. Dahlgren
 Aspalathus lanceifolia R. Dahlgren

 Aspalathus lanifera R. Dahlgren
 Aspalathus laricifolia Bergius
 subsp. canescens (L.) R. Dahlgren
 subsp. laricifolia Bergius
 Aspalathus latifolia Bolus
 Aspalathus leiantha (E. Phillips) R. Dahlgren

 Aspalathus lenticula Bolus

 Aspalathus leptoptera Bolus

 Aspalathus leucophylla R. Dahlgren

 Aspalathus linearis (Burm. f.) R. Dahlgren
 Aspalathus linguiloba R. Dahlgren

 Aspalathus longifolia Benth.
 Aspalathus longipes Harv.
 Aspalathus lotiflora R. Dahlgren

 Aspalathus macrantha Harv.
 Aspalathus macrocarpa Eckl. & Zeyh.
 Aspalathus marginalis Eckl. & Zeyh.
 Aspalathus marginata Harv.

 Aspalathus microphylla DC.

 Aspalathus millefolia R. Dahlgren
 Aspalathus monosperma (DC.) R. Dahlgren

 Aspalathus mundiana Eckl. & Zeyh.

 Aspalathus muraltioides Eckl. & Zeyh.
 Aspalathus myrtillifolia Benth.
 Aspalathus neglecta T. M. Salter

 Aspalathus nigra L.

 Aspalathus nivea Thunb.
 Aspalathus nudiflora Harv.
 Aspalathus obliqua R. Dahlgren
 Aspalathus oblongifolia R. Dahlgren

 Aspalathus obtusifolia R. Dahlgren
 Aspalathus odontoloba R. Dahlgren
 Aspalathus oliveri R. Dahlgren
 Aspalathus opaca Eckl. & Zeyh.
 subsp. opaca Eckl. & Zeyh.
 subsp. pappeana (Harv.) R. Dahlgren
 subsp. rostriloba R. Dahlgren
 Aspalathus orbiculata Benth.

 Aspalathus pachyloba Benth.
 subsp. macroclada R. Dahlgren
 subsp. pachyloba Benth.
 subsp. rugulicarpa R. Dahlgren
 subsp. villicaulis R. Dahlgren
 Aspalathus pallescens Eckl. & Zeyh.
 Aspalathus pallidiflora R. Dahlgren

 Aspalathus parviflora Bergius
 Aspalathus patens R. Dahlgren
 Aspalathus pedicellata Harv.
 Aspalathus pedunculata Houtt.

 Aspalathus pendula R. Dahlgren

 Aspalathus perfoliata (Lam.) R. Dahlgren
 Aspalathus perforata (Thunb.) R. Dahlgren

 Aspalathus pigmentosa R. Dahlgren
 Aspalathus pilantha R. Dahlgren

 Aspalathus pinea Thunb.
 Aspalathus pinguis Thunb.

 Aspalathus polycephala E. Mey.
 Aspalathus potbergensis R. Dahlgren
 Aspalathus proboscidea R. Dahlgren

 Aspalathus prostrata Eckl. & Zeyh.
 Aspalathus psoraleoides (C. Presl) Benth.

 Aspalathus pulicifolia R. Dahlgren
 Aspalathus pumila R. Dahlgren

 Aspalathus pycnantha R. Dahlgren
 Aspalathus quadrata L. Bolus
 Aspalathus quinquefolia L.
 subsp. compacta R. Dahlgren
 subsp. quinquefolia L.
 subsp. virgata (Thunb.) R. Dahlgren
 Aspalathus radiata R. Dahlgren
 Aspalathus ramosissima R. Dahlgren
 Aspalathus ramulosa E. Mey.
 Aspalathus rectistyla R. Dahlgren
 Aspalathus recurva Benth.
 Aspalathus recurvispina R. Dahlgren

 Aspalathus repens R. Dahlgren
 Aspalathus retroflexa L.
 subsp. bicolor (Eckl. & Zeyh.) R. Dahlgren
 subsp. retroflexa L.

 Aspalathus rigidifolia R. Dahlgren

 Aspalathus rosea R. Dahlgren
 Aspalathus rostrata Benth.
 Aspalathus rostripetala R. Dahlgren
 Aspalathus rubens Thunb.

 Aspalathus rubiginosa R. Dahlgren

 Aspalathus rugosa Thunb.
 Aspalathus rupestris R. Dahlgren
 Aspalathus rycroftii R. Dahlgren
 Aspalathus salicifolia R. Dahlgren
 Aspalathus salteri L. Bolus
 Aspalathus sanguinea Thunb.

 Aspalathus sceptrum-aureum R. Dahlgren

 Aspalathus secunda E. Mey.
 Aspalathus securifolia Eckl. & Zeyh.
 Aspalathus sericea Bergius
 Aspalathus serpens R. Dahlgren
 Aspalathus setacea Eckl. & Zeyh.

 Aspalathus simii Bolus

 Aspalathus smithii R. Dahlgren

 Aspalathus spectabilis R. Dahlgren

 Aspalathus spicata Thunb.
 Aspalathus spiculata R. Dahlgren
 Aspalathus spinescens Thunb.
 subsp. lepida (E. Mey.) R. Dahlgren
 subsp. spinescens Thunb.
 Aspalathus spinosa L.
 subsp. flavispina (C. Presl ex Benth.) R. Dahlgren
 subsp. glauca (Eckl. & Zeyh.) R. Dahlgren
 subsp. spinosa L.
 Aspalathus spinosissima R. Dahlgren

 Aspalathus stenophylla Eckl. & Zeyh.
 Aspalathus steudeliana Brongn.
 Aspalathus stokoei L. Bolus
 Aspalathus suaveolens Eckl. & Zeyh.
 Aspalathus submissa R. Dahlgren
 Aspalathus subtingens Eckl. & Zeyh.
 Aspalathus subulata Thunb.

 Aspalathus sulphurea R. Dahlgren
 Aspalathus taylorii R. Dahlgren

 Aspalathus tenuissima R. Dahlgren
 Aspalathus teres Eckl. & Zeyh.
 subsp. teres Eckl. & Zeyh.
 subsp. thodei R. Dahlgren
 Aspalathus ternata (Thunb.) Druce

 Aspalathus tridentata L.

 Aspalathus triquetra Thunb.
 Aspalathus truncata Eckl. & Zeyh.
 Aspalathus tuberculata Walp.
 Aspalathus tylodes Eckl. & Zeyh.
 Aspalathus ulicina Eckl. & Zeyh.
 subsp. kardouwensis R. Dahlgren
 subsp. ulicina Eckl. & Zeyh.

 Aspalathus uniflora L.

 Aspalathus vacciniifolia R. Dahlgren
 Aspalathus varians Eckl. & Zeyh.
 Aspalathus variegata Eckl. & Zeyh.
 Aspalathus venosa E. Mey.
 Aspalathus verbasciformis R. Dahlgren
 Aspalathus vermiculata Lam.

 Aspalathus villosa Thunb.

 Aspalathus vulnerans Thunb.
 Aspalathus vulpina R. Dahlgren

 Aspalathus wittebergensis Compton & P.E. Barnes
 Aspalathus wurmbeana E. Mey.
 Aspalathus zeyheri (Harv.) R. Dahlgren

References

Crotalarieae
Fabaceae genera